The following are former United States district courts, which ceased to exist because they were subdivided into smaller units. With the exception of California, each of these courts initially covered an entire U.S. state, and was subdivided as the jurisdictions which they covered increased in population. Two of the district courts—those of South Carolina and New Jersey—were subdivided but later recreated. Every change to the divisions and boundaries of these courts is effected by an act of the United States Congress, and for each such action, the statutory reference is identified.

Alabama

The Districts were reorganized on August 7, 1848. Only one judge was ever appointed to the District of Alabama.

Arkansas

Arkansas, originally part of the Louisiana Purchase, became part of the Missouri Territory in 1812, when Louisiana became a state. When Missouri became a state in 1819, a territorial government, including a territorial court, was organized for Arkansas, taking effect on July 4, 1819.

California

The United States District Court for the District of California existed from 1866 to 1886. California was admitted as a state on September 9, 1850, and was initially divided into two districts, the Northern and the Southern, by Act of Congress approved September 28 . The boundary line was at the 37th parallel north. The creating act provided that:

In addition to the ordinary jurisdiction and powers of a District Court of the United States, with which the Southern District Court of New York has been invested, the said Courts be and hereby are invested respectively within the limits of its district with the exercise of concurrent jurisdiction and power in all civil cases now exercised by the Circuit Courts of the United States; and that in all cases where said Courts shall exercise such jurisdiction, appeals may be taken from the judgments, orders or decrees of said Courts to the Supreme Court of the United States.

On February 27, 1851, President Millard Fillmore appointed Ogden Hoffman Jr., as the judge presiding over the Northern District. The Southern District of California was abolished and the State made to constitute one district by Act of Congress approved July 27, 1866, .

Hoffman, who had continued serving as the sole district judge, again became judge of the Northern district only, there continuing in service for five more years. Erskine Mayo Ross was appointed Judge of the new Southern District and served until his promotion to the Circuit Judgeship, when he was succeeded by Olin Wellborn.

Florida

On the same day that Florida was admitted as a state, March 3, 1845, Congress enacted legislation creating the United States District Court for the District of Florida, . On February 23, 1847,  divided the jurisdiction of this court between the Northern District and a Southern District Courts with the boundary between as:

[T]hat part of the State of Florida lying south of a line drawn due east and west from the northern point of Charlotte Harbor, including the islands, keys, reefs, shoals, harbors, bays and inlets, south of said line, shall be erected into a new judicial district, to be called the Southern District of Florida; a District Court shall be held in said Southern District, to consist of one judge, who shall reside at Key West, in said district...

The same statute directed the Northern District to hold court at Apalachicola, Florida, and Pensacola, Florida.

Georgia

The United States District Court for the District of Georgia was one of the original 13 courts established by the Judiciary Act of 1789, on September 24, 1789.

Illinois

The United States District Court for the District of Illinois was established by a statute passed by the United States Congress on March 3, 1819, . The act established a single office for a judge to preside over the court. Initially, the court was not within any existing judicial circuit, and appeals from the court were taken directly to the United States Supreme Court. In 1837, Congress created the United States Court of Appeals for the Seventh Circuit, placing it in Chicago, Illinois and giving it jurisdiction over the District of Illinois, . The District itself was eliminated by a statute passed on February 13, 1855, under which it was subdivided into the Northern and the Southern Districts. The boundaries of the District and the seats of the courts were set forth in the statute:

The counties of Hancock, McDonough, Peoria, Woodford, Livingston, and Iroquois, and all the counties in the said State north of them, shall compose one district, to be called the northern district of Illinois, and courts shall be held for the said district at the city of Chicago; and the residue of the counties of the said State shall compose another district, to be called the southern district of Illinois, and courts shall be held for the same at the city of Springfield.

The district has since been re-organized several times. It was later eliminated in a reorganization on October 2, 1978, which replaced it with a Central District, also formed from parts of the Northern and Southern Districts.

Indiana

Of all district courts that have been subdivided, Indiana existed for the longest time as a single court, 111 years.

Iowa

Kentucky

The United States District Court for the District of Kentucky was part of one of the original 13 courts established by the Judiciary Act of 1789, on September 24, 1789. At the time, Kentucky was not yet a state, but was within the territory of the state of Virginia. The District was unchanged when Kentucky became a state on June 1, 1792. On February 13, 1801, the Judiciary Act of 1801, abolished the U.S. district court in Kentucky, but the repeal of this Act restored the District on March 8, 1802, .

Louisiana

On March 26, 1804, Congress organized the Territory of Orleans and created the United States District Court for the District of Orleans – the first time Congress provided a territory with a district court equal in its authority and jurisdiction to those of the states. The District was thereafter subdivided and reformed several times.

During the course of its frequent subdivisions and reunifications, four judges served as judge of the District of Louisiana: Dominic Augustin Hall, (1812–1820), John Dick, (1821–1823), Theodore Howard McCaleb (1845–1849), and Edward Henry Durell (1866–1874). Hall was appointed to the District of Louisiana twice. He briefly resigned from the District Court to serve as a Justice of the Louisiana Supreme Court. He was shortly thereafter reappointed to the same seat on the District Court, which had remained vacant in his absence.

Michigan

The district court was not assigned to a judicial circuit, but was granted the same jurisdiction as United States circuit courts, except in appeals and writs of error, which were the jurisdiction of the Supreme Court. Due to the so-called "Toledo War", a boundary dispute with Ohio, Michigan did not become a state of the Union until January 26, 1837. On March 3, 1837, Congress passed an act that repealed the circuit court jurisdiction of the U.S. District Court for the District of Michigan, assigned the District of Michigan to the Seventh Circuit, and established a U.S. circuit court for the district, .

Ross Wilkins was the only district judge to serve the District of Michigan. He was nominated by President Andrew Jackson on July 2, 1836, to the newly created seat, and was confirmed by the United States Senate on July 2, 1836. He received his commission on January 26, 1837. Upon termination of the District of Michigan, Wilkins was reassigned to the Eastern District of Michigan.

Mississippi

It existed for over twenty years, and was subdivided into Northern and Southern Districts on June 18, 1838, by :

The State of Mississippi, at the date of the act of March 3, 1837... constituted one district, in which the District Court was invested with the powers of a Circuit Court. By that act the extraordinary jurisdiction of the District Court was abrogated. But by the acts of June 18, 1838, and of February 16, 1839, the district of Mississippi was divided into two districts, the Northern and Southern; and by the latter act the powers of a Circuit Court were conferred on the District Court for the Northern District.

Missouri

However, an act of Congress passed in 1845 and upheld by the United States Supreme Court in 1851, extending federal admiralty jurisdiction to inland waterways, resulted in a substantial increase in the number of admiralty cases arising from traffic on the Mississippi River. These disputes involved "contracts of affreightment, collisions, mariners' wages, and other causes of admiralty jurisdiction", and litigants of matters arising in the port city of St. Louis found it inconvenient to travel far inland to Jefferson City for their cases to be tried.

New Jersey

The United States District Court for the District of New Jersey was one of the original 13 courts established by the Judiciary Act of 1789, on September 24, 1789. The District was subdivided into the United States District Court for the Eastern District of New Jersey and the United States District Court for the Western District of New Jersey on February 13, 1801, by the Judiciary Act of 1801, with the judicial districts being headquartered in New Brunswick and Burlington, respectively. The only judge to serve on the briefly subdivided courts was Robert Morris, who had begun serving as a recess appointment to the District of New Jersey on August 28, 1790 and continued serving after the restoration of the single court, until June 2, 1815.

New York

The United States District Court for the District of New York was one of the original 13 courts established by the Judiciary Act of 1789, on September 24, 1789.

North Carolina

The United States District Court for the District of North Carolina has a unique history among defunct district courts.

In both instances, these districts, unlike those with geographic designations that existed in other states, were titled by the names of the cities in which the courts sat. After the first division, they were styled the District of Edenton, the District of New Bern, and the District of Wilmington; after the second division, they were styled the District of Albemarle, the District of Cape Fear, and the District of Pamptico. However, in both instances, only one judge was authorized to serve all three districts, causing them to effectively operate as a single district. The latter combination was occasionally referred to by the cumbersome title of the United States District Court for the Albemarle, Cape Fear & Pamptico Districts of North Carolina. Judge Henry Potter's 55 years of service on this court during the period in which the state contained a single district, from April 1802 to December 1857, represents one of the longest terms ever held by a United States federal judge.

Ohio

Pennsylvania

The United States District Court for the District of Pennsylvania was one of the original 13 courts established by the Judiciary Act of 1789, on September 24, 1789.

South Carolina
The United States District Court for the District of South Carolina was one of the original 13 courts established by the Judiciary Act of 1789, on September 24, 1789. The Eastern District was headquartered at Florence, and the Western District was headquartered in Greenville. The division was solely for the purposes of holding court – a single judge presided over both districts, and the act authorized no additional court staff.

In 1898 the United States Supreme Court held in Barrett v. United States that South Carolina legally constituted a single judicial district. South Carolina was again Eastern and the Western Districts, with one judgeship authorized to serve both districts, effective January 1, 1912.

Judges of the Eastern District of South Carolina:

Judges of the Western District of South Carolina:

Tennessee

The judgeship was filled by President George Washington's appointment of John McNairy. Since Congress failed to assign the district to a circuit, the court had the jurisdiction of both a district court and a circuit court. Appeals from this one district court went directly to the United States Supreme Court.

On February 13, 1801, in the famous "Midnight Judges" Act of 1801, Congress abolished the U.S. district court in Tennessee, and expanded the number of circuits to six, provided for independent circuit court judgeships, and abolished the necessity of Supreme Court Justices riding the circuits. It was this legislation which created the grandfather of the present Sixth Circuit. The act provided for a "Sixth Circuit" comprising two districts in the State of Tennessee, one district in the State of Kentucky and one district, called the Ohio District, composed of the Ohio and Indiana territories (the latter including the present State of Michigan). The new Sixth Circuit Court was to be held at "Bairdstown" in the District of Kentucky, at Knoxville in the District of East Tennessee, at Nashville in the District of West Tennessee, and at Cincinnati in the District of Ohio. Unlike the other circuits which were provided with three circuit judges, the Sixth Circuit was to have only one circuit judge with district judges from Kentucky and Tennessee comprising the rest of the court. Any two judges constituted a quorum. New circuit judgeships were to be created as district judgeships in Kentucky and Tennessee became vacant.

The repeal of this Act restored the District on March 8, 1802, . The District was divided into the Eastern and Western Districts on April 29, 1802. On February 24, 1807, Congress again abolished the two districts and created the United States Circuit for the District of Tennessee. On March 3, 1837, Congress assigned the judicial district of Tennessee to the Eighth Circuit. Again, only one judgeship was allotted for all three districts. On July 15, 1862, Congress reassigned appellate jurisdiction to the Sixth Circuit. Finally, on June 14, 1878, Congress authorized a separate judgeship for each district of Tennessee.

Texas

John Charles Watrous, appointed to the court by President James K. Polk in May 1846, was the only federal judge to sit for the district. When the District was subdivided, Watrous continued as judge for the Eastern District only, while Thomas Howard DuVal was appointed to the Western District. Watrous continued serving in the Eastern District until 1870.

Virginia

The United States District Court for the District of Virginia was one of the original 13 courts established by the Judiciary Act of 1789, on September 24, 1789.

On February 13, 1801, the Judiciary Act of 1801, divided Virginia into three judicial districts: the District of Virginia, which included the counties west of the Tidewater and south of the Rappahannock River; the District of Norfolk, which included the Tidewater counties south of the Rappahannock; and the District of Potomac, which included the counties north and east of the Rappahannock as well as Maryland counties along the Potomac. Just over a year later, on March 8, 1802, the Judiciary Act of 1801 was repealed and Virginia became a single District again, effective July 1, 1802.

At that time, West Virginia was still part of Virginia, and was encompassed in Virginia's Western District.

Washington

Only one judge was ever appointed to the District of Washington.

West Virginia

West Virginia split from the state of Virginia during the American Civil War. At that time, Virginia was already divided into an Eastern and Western District.

John Jay Jackson Jr., who had been appointed by Abraham Lincoln to what was then the Western District of Virginia, became the first judge of the District of West Virginia. He remained the only judge on that court until its subdivision.

Wisconsin

Only one judge was ever appointed to the District of Wisconsin.

See also
 List of courts of the United States
 List of United States district and territorial courts
 List of United States federal courthouses

References